Musical Symbols is a Unicode block containing characters for representing modern musical notation. Fonts that support it include Bravura, Euterpe, FreeSerif, Musica and Symbola. The Standard Music Font Layout (SMuFL), which is supported by the MusicXML format, expands on the Musical Symbols Unicode Block's 220 glyphs by using the Private Use Area in the Basic Multilingual Plane, permitting close to 2600 glyphs.

Block

History
The following Unicode-related documents record the purpose and process of defining specific characters in the Musical Symbols block:

See also 
 Miscellaneous Symbols (Unicode block) starting with U+2669 has, for example, the simple accidental signs.
 Ancient Greek Musical Notation (Unicode block)
 Byzantine Musical Symbols (Unicode block)
 Znamenny Musical Notation (Unicode block)
 List of musical symbols

References 

Unicode blocks
Musical notation